The Drom HaSharon Regional Council (translit. Mo'atza Azorit Drom HaSharon, lit. Southern Sharon Regional Council) is a regional council in the Sharon region in central Israel. Its offices are located on Highway 40 near Neve Yarak.

List of settlements, moshavim, kibbutzim and villages
Adanim
Einat
Elishema
Eyal
Gan Haim
Ganei Am
Gat Rimon
Givat Hen
Givat HaShlosha
Hagor
Horshim
Kfar Ma'as
Kfar Malal
Kfar Sirkin
Magshimim
Matan
Nachshonim
Neve Yamin
Neve Yarak
Nir Eliyahu
Nirit
Ramat HaKovesh
Ramot HaShavim
Sdei Hemed
Sde Warburg
Tzofit
Tzur Natan
Yarhiv
Yarkona

Twin Towns
Drom HaSharon Regional Council is twinned with:
 Neuwied, Germany.

External links
Official website 

 
Regional councils in Israel
Central District (Israel)
Sharon plain